Westra is a toponymic surname of West Frisian origin, approximately meaning "from the West". People with the name include:

Ans Westra (1936–2023), Dutch-born New Zealand photographer
Berry Westra (born 1961), Dutch bridge player
Lieuwe Westra (1982–2023), Dutch racing cyclist
Steven Westra (born 1969), American (South Dakota) politician
Willem Westra van Holthe (born 1948),  New Zealand-born Australian politician
Willy Westra van Holthe (1888–1965), Dutch football forward

See also
Westray, one of the Orkney Islands
, parasitoid wasp of the family Pteromalidae
Burgh Westra, Virginia State historic home, named after the Scottish phrase for "Village of the West"
FPV Westra, former Scottish patrol boat, now MY Steve Irwin, flagship of the Sea Shepherd Conservation Society
Westra Wermlands Sparbank, Swedish savings bank

References

Surnames of Frisian origin
Toponymic surnames